Marital breakdown refers to the common process whereby the relationship between a married couple erodes, such that they cannot ordinarily restore their relationship.  There are many stages to the process, and each individual goes through the stages at different rates.  It is a complex process involving psychology, personal finance, and often religion. It is the breach of domestic anticipation, often leading to a divorce or dissolution of the marital relationship.  Often there are children, in-laws, and other individuals involved in the process.  At the end of the process, there may be no relationship left, or there may be a long-term relationship at a distance (see legal separation).  Every marital breakdown is different in this regard.

There are many reasons why some marriages last and others break down. The famous 1989 movie The War of the Roses depicts an extremely violent marital breakdown, where two otherwise reasonable people break down into violent fits of anger directed at one another.  Such violence often requires immediate legal intervention to keep individuals from harming one another.  In most states, a domestic violence restraining order (also sometimes called an Order of Protection) is routinely granted when one domestic partner proves that the other has caused violence.

Not all marital breakdowns necessarily result in a divorce.  Not all divorces result from marital breakdowns, though the courts ordinarily require one of the parties to attest on penalty of perjury that such a breakdown has occurred before a divorce can be granted.

In Hausa culture, divorce refers to the wife receiving an agreement that the husband has rejected the marriage; she is expected to return to her father's house.

See also 
 Interpersonal communication relationship dissolution

Marriage
Divorce